Cleaver Lake may refer to:

In Canada
Cleaver Lake (Manitoba)
Cleaver Lake (New Brunswick)
Cleaver Lake (Northwest Territories)
Ontario
Cleaver Lake (Thunder Bay District)
Cleaver Lake (Timiskaming District)

See also
Peter Cleaver Lake (Alaska)
North Cleaver Lake (Ontario)